Yves Bonnamour (born 16 July 1961) is a French former professional road cyclist. Professional from 1988 to 1990, he most notably won the 1990 Route du Sud. His son Franck is also a cyclist.

Major results
1984
 2nd Grand Prix des Marbriers
1985
 1st Stage 2 Circuit des Ardennes
1986
 1st Overall Circuit de Saône-et-Loire
1987
 4th Overall Tour de l'Avenir
1988
 3rd Boucles de l'Aulne
1989
 2nd Grand Prix de la Libération (TTT)
1990
 1st  Overall Route du Sud
 1st Stage 2 Tour du Limousin

References

External links
 

1961 births
Living people
French male cyclists